Faid may refer to:

People
 Mary Alice Faid (1897–1990), British author
 Robert W. Faid (1929–2008), American author
 Rédoine Faïd (born 1972), French criminal
 Íriel Fáid, Irish king
 Faid Kk , Software engineer Malappuram

Places
 El Faid, Morocco
 Faid, Rhineland-Palatinate, Germany
 Faïd, Tunisia